The 1988 UEFA Cup Final was an association football tie played on 4 May 1988 and 18 May 1988 between RCD Español of Spain and Bayer Leverkusen of West Germany, to determine the champion of the 1987–88 UEFA Cup competition. Leverkusen won 3–2 on penalties after a 3–3 draw on aggregate.

Route to the final

Match details

First leg

Second leg

See also
UEFA Cup 1987-88
RCD Espanyol in European football

Notes

References

RSSSF

2
RCD Espanyol matches
Bayer 04 Leverkusen matches
1988
Association football penalty shoot-outs
1988
1988
1987–88 in Spanish football
1987–88 in German football
1988 in West German sport
May 1988 sports events in Europe
1980s in Barcelona
1980s in North Rhine-Westphalia
Sports competitions in Barcelona
Sports competitions in North Rhine-Westphalia
1988 in Catalonia